The Alexander Dallas Bache Monument is the tomb of Alexander Dallas Bache, a noted American scientist and surveyor. Bache died in Newport, Rhode Island in 1867 and was transported to Washington, DC's Congressional Cemetery for burial. American architect Henry Hobson Richardson was commissioned to build a tomb in 1868. The tomb is one of only three examples of a monument designed by Richardson and a rare example of a Richardson structure lacking Romanesque design points.

References
Ochsner, Jeffrey Karl, H.H. Richardson: Complete Architectural Works, MIT Press, Cambridge MA  1984

1868 sculptures
Henry Hobson Richardson buildings
Outdoor sculptures in Washington, D.C.
Richardsonian Romanesque architecture in Washington, D.C.
Stone sculptures in Washington, D.C.